Stacy Szymaszek (born July 17, 1969 in Milwaukee, Wisconsin) is an American poet, professor, and arts administrator.  She was the executive director of the Poetry Project at St Mark's church from 2007 to 2018 and worked at Woodland Pattern Book Center from 1999 to 2005.  She is the recipient of a 2014 New York Foundation for the Arts Fellowship in Poetry and a 2019 Foundation for Contemporary Arts grant in poetry.

Szymaszek is the author of five books: A Year from Today (Nightboat Books, 2018), hart island (Nightboat Books, 2015), Emptied of All Ships (Litmus Press, 2005) and Hyperglossia (Litmus Press, 2009), as well as Journal of Ugly Sites and Other Journals, which won the 2014 Ottoline Prize from Fence Books. Her three newest books comprise a trilogy of diaries that trace her experiences in New York City. Szymaszek's work favors the long form and takes influence from New York School poets in incorporating and engaging with the everyday. Szymaszek's poems, as writer Kay Gabriel points out, work with Frank O'Hara's "I do this, I do that" mode of writing through experience and location.

She has also authored numerous chapbooks of poetry, including austerity measures (Fewer and Further Press, 2012), Orizaba: A Voyage with Hart Crane (Faux Press, 2008), Stacy S.: Autoportraits (OMG, 2008) and Pasolini Poems (Cy Press, 2005).  During her time in Milwaukee, she was the founder and editor of GAM, a free magazine featuring the work of poets living in the upper midwest.

Szymaszek earned a B.A. at University of Wisconsin–Milwaukee. She grew up in the Milwaukee area and attended Catholic schools before moving around in her early twenties, including a summer at Kate Millett's farm. From 1999 to 2005, she worked at Woodland Pattern Book Center in Milwaukee's Riverwest neighborhood. In 2005, she moved to New York City, where from 2007 to 2018 she was executive director of the Poetry Project at St. Mark's Church. In 2018–2019, she was the Hugo Visiting Writer at the University of Montana.  She now lives in Tucson, Arizona.

Notes

External links
http://writing.upenn.edu/pennsound/x/Szymaszek.php] PennSound Author Pages

Living people
1969 births
Writers from Milwaukee
Poets from Wisconsin
American women poets
American lesbian writers
21st-century American poets
American LGBT poets
21st-century American women writers